Sampsonius is a genus of beetles belonging to the family Curculionidae.

The species of this genus are found in Southern America.

Species

Species:

Sampsonius alvarengai 
Sampsonius buculus 
Sampsonius conifer 
Sampsonius costaricensis 
Sampsonius dampfi 
Sampsonius ensifer 
Sampsonius giganteus 
Sampsonius kuazi 
Sampsonius mexicanus 
Sampsonius obtusicornis

References

Curculionidae
Curculionidae genera